Burning Palms may refer to:

 Burning Palms (film)
 Burning Palms, New South Wales